Dark Sun Campaign Setting, Expanded and Revised is an accessory for the 2nd edition of the Advanced Dungeons & Dragons fantasy role-playing game, published in 1995.

Contents
This revised campaign set for the Dark Sun setting takes into account the extraordinary political and physical changes that the world of Athas has undergone in the time since the release of the original Dark Sun Boxed Set. This set expanded the campaign area to eight times its original size. Included are three large, colorful maps which provide topographical and geographical details of Athas, one of which is a large-scale cloth map that details the central campaign area.

Also included in the set are a referee's screen and four books: "Mystery of the Ancients" is a beginning adventure, "The Wanderer's Chronicle" is a description of the campaign world, and "The Age of Heroes" and "The Way of the Psionicist" are rule books. "The Way of the Psionicist" re-presents the psionics rules contained in Player's Option: Skills & Powers.

Campaign time starts shortly after a number of sorcerer kings have been deposed.

1 large canvas foldout map  
2 paper foldout maps
1 dungeon master screen
1 32-page book Mystery of the Ancients
1 96-page book The age of heroes
1 32-page book  The Way of the Psionics
1 128-page book  The wanderer's Chronicle

Publication history
Dark Sun Campaign Setting, Expanded and Revised was published by TSR, Inc. in 1995.

Reception
Cliff Ramshaw reviewed the revised edition of Dark Sun for Arcane magazine, rating it a 7 out of 10 overall. He felt that the changes to the psionics rules made for "a much more logical set-up than was previously in use. It's a matter of taste, though, as to whether you think there's any need for spell-like psionic powers when the game already supports such a wide variety of magical styles. He commented that there is "plenty of atmosphere in Dark Sun and, despite the seeming uniformity of the geography, a great deal of imagination has gone into detailing the various regions". He considered the adventure to be "somewhat lacklustre" as it is "short and extremely linear, leaving players with little chance to alter the outcome". Ramshaw concluded the review by saying: "All the same, if blood in the sand is the bag you're into, you'll find plenty to enjoy under the Dark Sun."

Reviews
Shadis #24

References

Dark Sun supplements
Role-playing game supplements introduced in 1995